The Roman Catholic Diocese of Maasin (Lat: Dioecesis Maasinensis) is a diocese of the Latin Church of the  Catholic Church in the Philippines, comprising the civil province of Southern Leyte and six municipalities from the fifth legislative district of Leyte. Erected in 1968, the diocese was erected from the Archdiocese of Palo. At present, the diocese has experienced no jurisdictional changes, and is a suffragan of the Archdiocese of Cebu. The current bishop is Most Reverend Precioso D. Cantillas, SDB, DD, appointed in 1998.

The diocese comprises the entire province of Southern Leyte, and the towns of Matalom, Bato, Hilongos, Hindang, Inopacan and Baybay in the province of Leyte, with the Maasin Parish Cathedral as the seat of the diocese. Distributed within its 2,505 square kilometers of land are 42 parishes, 1 quasi-parish and one chaplaincy. To facilitate administration these parishes have been grouped under seven vicariates.

History

The province of Southern Leyte is located in the southeastern portion of the island of Leyte. And the small island of Limasawa off its southern coast is historically significant as the place where Magellan landed, after having sailed from the island of Homonhon in Samar, to celebrate the first Catholic Mass in the Philippines. The chieftain of Limasawa, Kolambu and his men, with Magellan and his men, attended that first Mass celebrated by Father Pedro Valderrama. Until 1960, the island of Limasawa belonged to the island province of Leyte.

From 1595 to 1910, the area which now comprises the Diocese of Maasin belonged to the diocese of Cebu. From 1910 to 1937 it belonged to the Diocese of Calbayog. From 1937 to 1968, it came under the jurisdiction of the Diocese of Palo in Leyte.

On August 14, 1968, the Diocese of Maasin was canonically erected through an apostolic constitution with the incipit Dei Filium adorandum issued March 23, 1968 by Pope Paul VI. In June of the same year, Rev. Fr. Vicente T. Ataviado, a priest of the newly-created Diocese of Masbate, then parish priest of Masbate, Masbate, was appointed as its first bishop. He was consecrated on August 8, 1968, and installed as the First Bishop of Maasin on August 14 at Our Lady of Assumption Parish Church in Maasin, the capital of Southern Leyte.

Today it is a suffragan of the Archdiocese of Cebu.

The population of Southern Leyte is made up mostly of Cebuano-speaking people because of its closeness, geographically, to Cebu and Bohol. This population has now reached a total of 558,804, of which 90 per cent are Catholics. In recent years, awareness of their potent role in the local church has been perceived among the lay faithful – a result of diocesan programs designed to awaken the "sleeping giant" in the church. There has been a marked increase in the number of lay ministers to assist priests in every parish, as there has been in the number of volunteer catechists.

The Diocese of Maasin today has started to focus on the vision of the Second Plenary Council of the Philippines. Apart from the usual ministerial and sacramental functions, the clergy has succeeded to penetrate the people's conscience with concern for other issues, such as reforestation, among others.

The Social Action Center has generously offered help in livelihood projects to those who do not have the necessary capital. This has been successful in the abaca business enterprise. The Center is now in the process of opening up more opportunities for more livelihood projects. The Commission on Youth is helping in the formation of the youth in all the parishes of the diocese through youth encounters and leadership training. It has organized nine diocesan summer youth camps between 1993 and 2015, attended by more than a thousand delegates.

In 1993 the Diocese of Maasin marked its 25th anniversary as a diocese. The theme of the celebration set the direction which the diocese will follow in the next decade:  "RENEWAL: the challenge of the faithful in the Diocese of Maasin."

Thus the vision that was planted and took root when Father Pedro Valderrama celebrated the first Mass in the Philippines on March 21, 1521, has borne new fruit. Aside from the prospects of renewal for the entire diocese, the Chaplaincy of Limasawa was raised to that of a parish – the Holy Cross and First Mass of Limasawa Parish, on March 29, 1994, more than four centuries later.

Ordinaries

See also
Official website: http://www.dioceseofmaasin.com 
Catholic Church in the Philippines

References

Maasin
Maasin
Christian organizations established in 1968
Roman Catholic dioceses and prelatures established in the 20th century
Religion in Southern Leyte
Maasin